Patrick Waweru (born 9 June 1956) is a Kenyan boxer. He competed at the 1984 Summer Olympics and the 1988 Summer Olympics. At the 1988 Summer Olympics, he lost to Andreas Zulow of East Germany.

References

1956 births
Living people
Kenyan male boxers
Olympic boxers of Kenya
Boxers at the 1984 Summer Olympics
Boxers at the 1988 Summer Olympics
Place of birth missing (living people)
Commonwealth Games medallists in boxing
Boxers at the 1978 Commonwealth Games
Commonwealth Games silver medallists for Kenya
African Games gold medalists for Kenya
African Games medalists in boxing
Competitors at the 1987 All-Africa Games
Lightweight boxers
Medallists at the 1978 Commonwealth Games